This is a list of kite festivals.

Annual kite festivals
.

See also
Sport kite
Kite

External links
Drachen Foundation's 10 best kite festivals

References

Kite festivals
Kite